Nanshi may refer to:

Nanshi District, Baoding, in Hebei, China
Nanshi District, Shanghai, historical district of Shanghai, merged to Huangpu District, Shanghai, China
Nanshi River, in Taiwan
Nanshi, Tainan, or Nansi, Nanxi, township in Tainan County, Taiwan
Nan Shi, or History of Southern Dynasties, Chinese official history book for the Southern Dynasties